The Football Association Challenge Vase, commonly known as the FA Vase, is a knockout cup competition in English football, organised by and named after The Football Association (the FA).  It was staged for the first time in the 1974–75 season, effectively replacing the FA Amateur Cup, which was discontinued after the abolition of official amateur status by the FA. While the leading teams from the Amateur Cup switched to the existing FA Trophy, the lower-level teams entered the new FA Vase. As of 2013, the Vase is open to all clubs in levels five to seven of the National League System, equivalent to levels nine to eleven of the overall English football league system, although clubs from other leagues may apply to enter if their stadiums meet certain requirements.

The record for the most wins is held by Whitley Bay, with four victories. Whitley Bay have also won in three consecutive seasons. Billericay Town, Halesowen Town and Tiverton Town have each won the Vase in two consecutive seasons.

The Vase is currently held by Newport Pagnell Town, who beat Littlehampton Town in the 2022 final.

History

The first FA Vase final was won by Hoddesdon Town of the Spartan League who, despite being regarded as underdogs, beat Epsom & Ewell of the Surrey Senior League. In three of the four following seasons, Billericay Town won the competition to become the first team to win the Vase on three occasions, a feat matched in 2010 by Whitley Bay. During the 1980s, the tournament was won by teams that represented many different leagues from all parts of the country, from Whickham of the Wearside League in the northeast to Forest Green Rovers of the Hellenic League in the south. Halesowen Town became the second team to win the Vase in consecutive seasons, with victories in 1985 and 1986.

In the 1990s, Guiseley and Tiverton Town both appeared in the final more than once. Tiverton became the third club to win consecutive finals, emerging victorious in 1998 and 1999. Two years later Taunton Town won the Vase, giving clubs from the Western League three wins in four seasons. From 2009 to 2018, all ten finals involved a team from Northern League Division One, with eight of them taking the trophy. Brigg Town of the Northern Counties East League became the fourth club to win the Vase more than once in 2003, seven years after the club's first victory, and six years later Whitley Bay became the fifth club to achieve the feat. In 2019 AFC Fylde (formerly known as Kirkham & Wesham became the first team to have won both the FA Trophy and FA Vase.

Finals
Originally, if the final finished with the scores level after extra time, the teams would play again in a replay at a later date; more recently the final has always been decided on the day, with a penalty shootout as required. The winning club receives the FA Vase itself and, as of 2010, prize money of £20,000, in addition to that accumulated for winning earlier rounds.

Key

Results

Results by team
Teams shown in italics are no longer in existence. Teams shown in bold compete in the Premier League or the English Football League as of 2021 and therefore do not enter the FA Vase or FA Trophy.

References

finals
FA Vase
FA Vase